A. M. M. Murugappa Chettiar (23 January 1902 – 31 October 1965) was an Indian industrialist who served as the first Indian President of the Madras Chamber of Commerce and Industry. He is the founder of Murugappa Group.

References

1902 births
1965 deaths
Indian industrialists
Businesspeople from Chennai
Murugappa family